The Rideau Institute is a non-profit independent research and advocacy group based in Ottawa. It focuses on foreign policy and defence policy issues.

It was founded in January 2007. It is based in Ottawa, Ontario, Canada.

Personnel

Directors

 Peggy Mason, President of the Rideau Institute, former UN Ambassador for Disarmament 
 Steven Staples, Vice-President of the Rideau Institute, commentator, and author of Missile Defence: Round One
 Michael Byers, Professor and Canada Research Chair in Global Politics and International Law at the University of British Columbia and author of Intent for a Nation, What is Canada For?
 Bruce Campbell, Executive Director of the Canadian Centre for Policy Alternatives and author of numerous books and studies on Canadian public policy
 Kathleen Ruff, former Director of the British Columbia Human Rights Commission and former director of the Court Challenges Program
 Mel Watkins, professor emeritus of economics and political science, University College, University of Toronto; author; and well-known Canadian political figure

Senior Advisors

 Maude Barlow, author and Chairperson of The Council of Canadians
 Peter Coombes, co-founder of Ceasefire.ca and Job Evaluation Representative for CUPE
 Murray Dobbin, political commentator and author
 Walter Dorn, Associate Professor of Defence Studies, Royal Military College of Canada
 Mel Hurtig (deceased, 2016), author, former publisher, and founder of The Council of Canadians
 Wade Huntley, Director of the Simons Centre for Disarmament and Non-Proliferation Research, Liu Institute for Global Issues, University of British Columbia
 Anil Naidoo, International water policy analyst and Project Organizer of the Blue Planet Project
 Douglas Roche, author, former parliamentarian and senator (retired)
 Bill Robinson, former Program Associate, Project Ploughshares
 Erika Simpson, Associate Professor of Political Science, University of Western Ontario
 Scott Sinclair, director of Trade and Investment Research Project, Canadian Centre for Policy Alternatives
 Alice Slater, Director, Nuclear Age Peace Foundation, NY
 Gar Pardy, former Canadian diplomat

See also
Ceasefire Canada
RightOnCanada.ca

Notes

External links

Rideau Institute website

Political advocacy groups in Canada
Organizations based in Ottawa